Donna Marie Testerman (born 1960) is a mathematician specializing in the representation theory of algebraic groups. She is a professor of mathematics at the École Polytechnique Fédérale de Lausanne in Switzerland.

Testerman completed her Ph.D. at the University of Oregon in 1985. Her dissertation, Certain Embeddings of Simple Algebraic Groups, was supervised by Gary Seitz. As a faculty member at Wesleyan University, she won a Sloan Research Fellowship in 1992.

Testerman is an author or editor of several books and book-length research monographs in mathematics including:
Irreducible subgroups of exceptional algebraic groups (1988)
 subgroups of exceptional algebraic groups (1999)
Centres of centralizers of unipotent elements in simple algebraic groups (2011)
Group Representation Theory (2007)
Linear algebraic groups and finite groups of Lie type (2011)

References

1960 births
Living people
Women mathematicians
University of Oregon alumni
Wesleyan University faculty
Academic staff of the École Polytechnique Fédérale de Lausanne
Sloan Research Fellows